Symmoca solanella is a moth in the family Autostichidae. It was described by Hans Georg Amsel in 1953 and is found in Morocco.

References

Moths described in 1953
Symmoca